This article lists the modern political leaders of Tibet within the People's Republic of China. The transition from Lamaist rule in Tibet started in 1951 with the Seventeen Point Agreement between the Central People's Government and the 14th Dalai Lama. A "Preparatory Committee for the Autonomous Region of Tibet" (PCART) was established in 1956 to create a parallel system of administration along Communist lines. Transition to secular government completed when Tibet Autonomous Region was officially founded in 1965 according to the national autonomy law.

The politics in Tibet are structured in a dual party-government system like all other governing institutions in the People's Republic of China. Both the Chairman of the Tibet Autonomous Region and the Chairman of the regional People's Congress, are by law ethnic Tibetans. There is also a branch secretary of the Chinese Communist Party (CCP), who receives deference in disputes.

TAR Government Chairmen 
The Chairman is the nominal leader of the Tibet Autonomous Region (TAR), a province-level administrative division of the People's Republic of China. The Chairmen, and their times in office, are listed below. In practice, the Chairman is subordinate to the branch secretary of the Chinese Communist Party.

 Directors of the Preparatory Committee for the Tibet Autonomous Region
 14th Dalai Lama: April 1956 – March 1959
 10th Panchen Lama: March 1959 – December 1964 (acting)
 Ngapoi Ngawang Jigme: December 1964 – September 1965 (acting)

 Chairmen of the Tibet Autonomous Region People's Committee
 Ngapoi Ngawang Jigme: September 1965 – September 1968

 Heads of the Tibet Autonomous Region Revolutionary Committee
 As was the situation elsewhere in mainland China during the Cultural Revolution, the regional government was replaced by a revolutionary committee.
 Zeng Yongya (曾雍雅): September 1968 – November 1970
 Ren Rong (任荣): November 1970 – August 1979

 Chairmen of the Tibet Autonomous Region People's Government
 Sanggyai Yexe (Tian Bao): August 1979 – April 1981
 Ngapoi Ngawang Jigme: April 1981 – May 1983
 Doje Cedain ( / 多杰才旦) a.k.a. Dorje Tsetsen or Duoji Caidan: May 1983 – December 1985
 Doje Cering ( / 多吉才让 ) a.k.a. Dorje Tsering or Duoji Cairang: December 1985 – May 1990
 Gyaincain Norbu: May 1990 – May 1998
 Legqog: May 1998 – May 2003
 Qiangba Puncog: May 2003 – January 2010
 Padma Choling: January 2010 – January 2013
 Losang Jamcan: January 2013 – January 2017
 Che Dalha (齐扎拉): January 2017 – October 2021
 Yan Jinhai: from October 2021

CCP TAR Committee Secretaries 
 Secretaries of the Chinese Communist Party Tibet Autonomous Region Committee
 Zhang Guohua (张国华): January 1950 – June 1951 
 Fan Ming (范明): June 1951 – December 1951 
 Zhang Jingwu (张经武): March 1952 – August 1965 
 Zhang Guohua (张国华): September 1965 – February 1967 
 Ren Rong (任荣): August 1971 – March 1980 
 Yin Fatang (阴法唐): March 1980 – June 1985 
 Wu Jinghua (伍精華): June 1985 – December 1988 
 Hu Jintao (胡锦涛): December 1988 – November 1992 
 Chen Kuiyuan (陈奎元): November 1992 – September 2000 
 Guo Jinlong (郭金龙): September 2000 – December 2004 
 Yang Chuantang (杨传堂): December 2004 – November 2005 
 Zhang Qingli (张庆黎): November 2005 – August 2011 
 Chen Quanguo (陈全国): August 2011 – August 2016
 Wu Yingjie (吴英杰): August 2016 – October 2021
 Wang Junzheng (王君正): from October 2021

TAR People's Congress Standing Committee Chairmen 
 Chairmen of the Standing Committee of the Tibet Autonomous Region People's Congress
 Ngapoi Ngawang Jigme ( / 阿沛·阿旺晋美): 1979–1981 
 Yang Dongsheng (杨东生) (né  / 协饶登珠) (ethnic Tibetan): 1981–1983 
 Ngapoi Ngawang Jigme ( / 阿沛·阿旺晋美): 1983–1993 
 Raidi ( / 热地): 1993–2003 
 Legqog ( / 列确): 2003–2010
 Qiangba Puncog ( / 向巴平措): 2010–2013
 Padma Choling ( / 白玛赤林): 2013–2017
 Losang Jamcan ( / 洛桑江村) a.k.a. Losang Gyaltsen: from 2017

CPPCC TAR Committee Chairmen 
 Chairmen of the Chinese People's Political Consultative Conference Tibet Autonomous Region Committee
 Tan Guansan (谭冠三)
 Zhang Guohua (张国华)
 Ren Rong (任荣)
 Yin Fatang (阴法唐)
 Yangling Dorje (杨岭多吉) (ethnic Tibetan)
 Raidi ( / 热地)
 Pagbalha Geleg Namgyai ( / 帕巴拉·格列朗杰), 11th Pagbalha ( / 帕巴拉活佛)

See also 

 List of rulers of Tibet
 Central Tibetan Administration
 List of current Chinese provincial leaders
 Politics of the People's Republic of China
 Constitution of the People's Republic of China

References